The 1926 BYU Cougars football team was an American football team that represented Brigham Young University (BYU) as a member of the Rocky Mountain Conference (RMC) during the 1926 college football season. In their second season under head coach Charles J. Hart, the Cougars compiled an overall record of 1–5–1 with a mark of 1–4–1 in conference play, finished tenth in the RMC, and were outscored by a total of 115 to 49.

Schedule

References

BYU
BYU Cougars football seasons
BYU Cougars football